Stanisław Mielech (29 April 1894 – 17 November 1962) was a Polish footballer. He played in two matches for the Poland national football team from 1921 to 1922.

From 1923 to 1927 he was associated with Legia Warsaw. He was the originator of the name of this club.

In December 2018, a plaque commemorating Stanisław Mielech was unveiled on the facade of the Polish Army Stadium in Warsaw.

References

External links
 

1894 births
1962 deaths
People from Stalowa Wola County
Polish footballers
Poland international footballers
Association footballers not categorized by position